The Powrachute Syk Rascal is an American powered parachute, designed and produced by Powrachute.

Design and development
The aircraft was designed to comply with the FAI Microlight rules it features a parachute-style high-wing and single-seat in an open framed structure, tricycle landing gear and a single  Rotax 503 engine in pusher configuration. A version with a Rotax 447 to meet the FAR 103 Ultralight rules is also available.

Specifications (Rotax 503)

References

External links

2000s United States ultralight aircraft
Single-engined pusher aircraft
Powered parachutes